Fort Bend County Libraries is a public library system serving the county of Fort Bend, Texas. The main library, the George Memorial Library, is located in Richmond, Texas.

History
Prior to the founding of the Fort Bend County Library there existed a Share-a-Book Club run by ladies of the towns constituting the area. In 1947 these ladies appealed to the Commissioners' Court of Fort Bend County to establish a library which was granted and constructed by 1948. The original building held 1,000 books but was quickly deemed to be insufficient for growth and a new library underwent construction in November 1948. At a cost of $50,000 the new building opened on July 7, 1949 and held 8,111 volumes. It received an addition in 1958 which added a historical room and a Daughters of the Revolutionary War collection.

Branches

Gallery

References

External links

 Fort Bend County Libraries

Fort Bend
Education in Fort Bend County, Texas
Education in Houston